Shabbir Ahmad Usmani (11 October 188713 December 1949) was an Islamic scholar who supported the Pakistan Movement in the 1940s. He was a religious scholar, writer, orator, politician, and expert in Tafsir and Hadith.

Born in 1887 in Bijnor, Usmani was an alumnus of Darul Uloom Deoband. He was the son of Fazlur Rahman Usmani. His brother Azizur Rahman Usmani was the first Grand Mufti of Darul Uloom Deoband. His nephews include Atiqur Rahman Usmani and Shams Naved Usmani. Usmani was the first to hoist the Flag of Pakistan at Karachi  on 14 August 1947, and led the funeral prayers of Muhammad Ali Jinnah. He died in 1949. His major work is the Tafsīr-e-Usmāni, which he co-authored with his teacher Mahmud Hasan Deobandi.

Early life

He was born on 11 October 1887 in Bijnor, a city in North-Western Provinces, British India. His father, Fazlur Rahman Usmani, was a deputy inspector of schools and had been sent on assignment to Bareilly, when his son Shabbir was born.

Education and career
He was educated at Darul Uloom Deoband, where he became a disciple of Mahmud Hasan Deobandi, and graduated in 1908. After his graduation, he was appointed as a teacher at Darul Uloom Deoband.

In 1915, when Mahmud Hasan went into self-exile in Hijaz, Saudi Arabia, Usmani filled his position as the teacher of Sahih al-Muslim, a book of teachings of Muhammad. In 1925, Sultan Abdul Aziz Ibn Saud of Saudi Arabia scheduled a conference for prominent religious scholars from all over the world. A deputation of a number of 'ulama' from India participated in this conference. It is believed that they chose Usmani as their leader after having a short conversation with him.

In 1926, he moved to Dabhel, a small predominantly Deobandi town in the Indian state of Gujarat, and became a teacher at Jamiah Islamiah Talimuddin Dabhel. In October 1929, when the foundation committee decided to establish Jamia Millia Islamia, he was elected as a member of the founding committee. Many other Islamic scholars also were members of the Foundation Committee including Husain Ahmad Madani, Abdul Bari Firangi Mahali, Mahmud Hasan Deobandi, Kifayatullah Dihlawi, and Abdul Haq Akorwi. In 1933, when Anwar Shah Kashmiri died, Usmani became the teacher of Sahih al-Bukhari, a book of teachings by Muhammad.

Literary works

Political career
Shabbir Ahmad Usmani was one of the founding members of Jamia Millia Islamia, New Delhi as he was a member of the Foundation Committee of the Jamia (University) that met on Friday, 29 October 1920. In 1944, he became a member of the All-India Muslim League and led a small group of Deobandis who supported the creation of Pakistan.

As a leader of this pro-Pakistan faction of Deobandis of the old Jamiat-e-Ulema-e-Hind party, which was originally founded in Deoband in 1919, he went ahead and founded a new and separate political party called the Jamiat Ulema-e-Islam in 1945, along with other like-minded pro-Pakistan religious leaders.  He joined Muslim League in 1944 at a critical juncture of Pakistan movement when most of the feudals of N.W.F.P. and Punjab came under the influence of the Congress. Shabbir Ahmad Usmani with a team of 500 Ulema eliminated the influence of these corrupt feudals from these regions and converted the sentiments of common people toward Pakistan movement. The importance of Maulana Usmani is also conspicuous from the fact that the Quaid-i-Azam consulted him on all important matters after independence. He served  JUI as its first president until his death in 1949. Usmani, with a team of approximately 500 other religious leaders, actively campaigned to convert the sentiments of common Muslim people in favor of the Pakistan movement. He played a key role in steering people away from some of the leaders  in Punjab, British India and N.W.F.P. who were previously supporting All India National Congress in those regions. In fact, he became a close consultant of Jinnah after the independence of Pakistan in 1947. He is also notable for having led the funeral prayer of Muhammad Ali Jinnah, the founder of Pakistan in September 1948.

When Pakistan became independent, its first flag hoisting was also done (in West Pakistan) by him in the presence of Muhammad Ali Jinnah and Liaqat Ali Khan (while in East Pakistan, his fellow, Allama Zafar Ahamd Usmani, did the flag hoisting in the presence of Khwaja Nazimuddin).

After the Partition of India, Usmani became a member of the Constituent Assembly of Pakistan, and remained a member until his death in 1949.

He is best remembered for having spearheaded the Qarardad-i-Maqasid Objectives Resolution for Pakistan, which was passed by the Constituent Assembly of Pakistan on March 12, 1949.

Views on Partition of India 
In 1946 Usmani furnished the Quranic basis for the establishment of Pakistan by citing the distinction between momin (believer) and kafir (non-believer).

Death and legacy
Usmani died at Baghdadul Jadid in Bahawalpur State on 13 December 1949, and was buried at Islamia Science College (Karachi) the next day.

Pakistan Postal Services issued a commemorative postage stamp in his honor in 1990 in its 'Pioneers of Freedom' series.

References

Sources
Hassan, Hafiz Muhammad
 

 Rizwan Hussain.  Pakistan and the emergence of Islamic militancy in Afghanistan. Ashgate Publishing, Ltd., 2005
, 

1887 births
1949 deaths
Muhajir people
Sunni Muslim scholars of Islam
Pakistani Islamic religious leaders
Pakistani scholars
Hanafi fiqh scholars
Hanafis
Maturidis
Deobandis
20th-century Muslim scholars of Islam
Pakistani Sunni Muslims
People from Uttar Pradesh
Quranic exegesis scholars
People from British India
Leaders of the Pakistan Movement
Jamiat Ulema-e-Islam politicians
Pakistani MNAs 1947–1954
Darul Uloom Deoband alumni
Academic staff of Darul Uloom Deoband
Students of Mahmud Hasan Deobandi
Usmani family
Founders of Indian schools and colleges
Academic staff of Jamia Islamia Talimuddin
Disciples of Ashraf Ali Thanwi
Members of the Constituent Assembly of Pakistan